Multiple ships of the Royal Navy have been named HMS Primrose including:

  was a  launched in 1807 and wrecked in 1809
  was the sole ship of her class; she was broken up in 1832
  was an  launched in 1915 and sold in 1923
 

Royal Navy ship names